Professional bodybuilders may refer to:

 Individuals who participate in professional bodybuilding
 List of female professional bodybuilders
 List of male professional bodybuilders